Malcolm Thomas (born c. 1963) is a former college basketball player.  He is listed at 6' 7" and played forward/guard for the University of Missouri (1983–1985).

Thomas first began playing collegiate basketball at Moberly (Mo.) Junior College (1981–1983) where he was named Outstanding Player by the National Junior College Tournament in 1983. He chose to transfer to Mizzou where he led the Tigers in scoring (17.4 ppg), field goal percentage (.530), rebounds (8.2 rpg) and blocks (37 total) in his senior year there. Thomas was named first team All Conference and an honorable mention All-American. He was later selected in the sixth round (121st pick overall) of the 1985 NBA Draft by the Los Angeles Clippers; however, he was wasn't able make the roster and never got to play in the NBA.

Thomas has a son, also named Malcolm Thomas, who plays professional basketball.

References

External links
 University of Missouri Official Athletic Site

1960s births
Living people
African-American basketball players
American men's basketball players
Los Angeles Clippers draft picks
Missouri Tigers men's basketball players
Moberly Greyhounds men's basketball players
Shooting guards
Small forwards
21st-century African-American people
20th-century African-American sportspeople